Elisa Bertino is a professor of computer science at Purdue University and is acting as the research director of CERIAS, the Center for Education and Research in Information Assurance and Security, an institute attached to Purdue University. Bertino's research interest include data privacy and computer security.

Education 
Bertino received her Ph.D. from the University of Pisa in 1980 under the supervision of Costantino Thanos. After postdoctoral research on IBM System R at the IBM Almaden Research Center, and then working for the Microelectronics and Computer Technology Corporation, she returned to academia. She was for many years on the faculty of the University of Milan, and chaired the computer science department there.

Publications 
She has authored or co-authored more than 250 journal articles, more than 450 conference papers, 9 books, and 35 edited volumes, with over 300 co-authors. She has been co-editor-in-chief of the GeoInformatica Journal and VLDB Journal, program co-chair of ICDE 1998, and program chair of ECOOP 2000, SACMAT 2002, and EDBT 2004.

Honors and awards
 2002 - Elected as a fellow of the Institute of Electrical and Electronics Engineers "for contributions to the theory of object-oriented databases, temporal databases, and database security." 
 2003 - Became a fellow of the Association for Computing Machinery "for contributions to secure database systems".
 2002 - Winner of an IEEE Technical Achievement Award in 2002 
 2005 - Winner of IEEE Computer Society Tsutomu Kanai Award
 2021 - IEEE Innovation in Societal Infrastructure Award

References 

Living people
University of Pisa alumni
Academic staff of the University of Milan
Purdue University faculty
Fellow Members of the IEEE
Fellows of the Association for Computing Machinery
Year of birth missing (living people)